DoCoMoMo Key Scottish Monuments is a list of 60 notable post-war buildings in Scotland, compiled in 1993 by the international architectural conservation organisation DoCoMoMo.

The buildings date from the period 1945–1970, and were selected by a panel as being significant examples of architectural style, building materials and location. The purpose was in part to raise the profile of post-war architecture, and to "demonstrate that architecture, as an art, flourished during those years". The list was the basis for an exhibition at the Royal Incorporation of Architects in Scotland, aimed at introducing some of these buildings as "heritage". The predominant view of post-war architecture, and of many modernist buildings in particular, was not favourable in the UK at the time, and the list was intended to inform the statutory listing of significant works. Some of the buildings, for example Notre Dame High School, had already been listed by Historic Scotland before the DoCoMoMo list was compiled, and several more have been designated since, including several at Category A, as "buildings of national or international importance".

The list includes a wide range of structures, from large industrial plants, to small private houses, and covers the diversity of building types that were constructed during the period. Not all the buildings have survived: two of the most prominent casualties have been Basil Spence's Hutchesontown C complex in Glasgow, demolished in 1993, and Gillespie, Kidd & Coia's St. Peter's Seminary in Cardross, which has been derelict since the late 1980s.

List

References

See also
 Prospect 100 best modern Scottish buildings

External links
 – Map of DoCoMoMo 60 Scottish Key Monuments (on Google Maps)

Architecture in Scotland
 
Lists of buildings and structures in Scotland
1993 documents
1993 in Scotland